Underbelly: Squizzy, the sixth series of the Australian Nine Network reality crime drama series anthology Underbelly, originally aired from 28 July 2013 to 1 September 2013. It is an eight-part series based on the life and career of notorious Melbourne gangster, Squizzy Taylor, and is set between 1915 and 1927. It premiered on 28 July 2013. The series began its production in late 2012, with filming commencing towards the end of 2012. It is the second series in the franchise after Badness not to have 13 episodes and the first series to be fully set in Melbourne since Underbelly.

Premise 
The sixth and final series of Underbelly depicts the rise and fall of one of Australia's most notorious 20th-century gangsters, Squizzy Taylor. It shows how Taylor became one of the most feared criminals in Melbourne at the time and his eventual death, which was also depicted in Underbelly: Razor. Justin Rosniak, who played Taylor in Razor, does not reprise his role in the new series; instead Jared Daperis has taken on the role.

Cast

Main cast 
 Jared Daperis as Joseph Theodore Leslie "Squizzy" Taylor
 Camille Keenan as Dolly Grey 
 Susie Porter as Rosie Taylor
 Ashley Zukerman as Detective James Bruce
 Luke Ford as Albert "Tankbuster" McDonald
 Dan Wyllie as Detective Frederick Piggott 
 Ken Radley as Detective John Brophy
 Nathan Page as Henry Stokes
 Diana Glenn as Annie Stokes
 Matt Boesenberg as John "Snowy" Cutmore
 Gracie Gilbert as Ida Pender
 Andrew Ryan as Angus "Gus" Murray 
 Richard Cawthorne as "Long Harry" Slater
 Ian Dixon as Ted Whiting 
 Sam Greco as Sam "Bunny" Whiting 
 Elise Jansen as Lorna Kelly
 Greg Fleet as Richard Buckley
 Jackson Ezard as Hugh Hanlon

Episodes

Viewership

Novelisation 
Andy Muir, one of the screenwriters of the series, wrote the novelisation Underbelly Squizzy which was due to be published by Allen & Unwin Australia in July 2013.

References

External links 

2013 Australian television series debuts
2013 Australian television series endings
2013 Australian television seasons
2010s Australian crime television series
2010s Australian drama television series
2010s Australian television miniseries
Nine Network original programming
Television series set in the 1910s
Television shows set in Victoria (Australia)
Television series set in the 1920s
Organised crime in Melbourne